Plymouth Arrow was the nameplate used for multiple captive imports made by Mitsubishi Motors and sold by the Chrysler Corporation under the Plymouth marque:
 The Mitsubishi Celeste, a compact car also sold as the Plymouth Arrow from 1976 to 1980
 The Mitsubishi Forte, a compact pickup truck also sold as the Plymouth Arrow from 1979 to 1982

Arrow

de:Plymouth Arrow